This is a list of all the reasons written by Justice Richard Wagner during his tenure as puisne justice of the Supreme Court of Canada.

2013 

Wagner